Arttu Mäkiaho  (born 16 September 1997) is a Finnish Nordic combined skier who competes internationally.

He competed at the 2018 Winter Olympics.

References

External links

1997 births
Living people
Finnish male Nordic combined skiers
Olympic Nordic combined skiers of Finland
Nordic combined skiers at the 2018 Winter Olympics
Nordic combined skiers at the 2022 Winter Olympics
People from Kajaani
Sportspeople from Kainuu
21st-century Finnish people